Erigeron concinnus, the Navajo fleabane, tidy fleabane or hairy daisy, is a perennial flowering plant in the family Asteraceae.

Erigeron concinnus is native to the dry mountains of the Mojave Desert around Death Valley in southeast California, north and east to Nevada, Idaho, Utah, Wyoming, Montana, Colorado, Arizona, and New Mexico; in the California portion of its range, it grows at elevations of 1200–1800 m. Some of the known populations lie inside Mojave National Preserve.

The flower heads are sometimes produced one per branch, sometimes in groups of up to 6, each head  in diameter, with 50-125 white, pink, or blue ray florets and yellow disk florets.

Varieties
Erigeron concinnus var. concinnus - Arizona, California, Colorado, Idaho, Nevada, New Mexico, Utah, Wyoming
Erigeron concinnus var. condensatus D.C.Eaton - New Mexico, Utah, Wyoming
Erigeron concinnus var. subglaber (Cronquist) G.L.Nesom - Arizona, Colorado, Utah

References

External links
Jepson Flora Project: Erigeron concinnus
Photo of herbarium specimen at Missouri Botanical Garden, collected in Nevada in 1937, isotype of Erigeron pumilus subsp. concinnoides Cronquist (syn of Erigeron concinnus)

concinnus
Flora of the Western United States
Plants described in 1839
Flora without expected TNC conservation status